Oliver Korn (born 10 June 1984, in Düsseldorf) is a field hockey player from Germany. He was a member of the Men's National Team that won the gold medal at the 2008 Summer Olympics and 2012 Summer Olympics.

References

 The Official Website of the Beijing 2008 Olympic Games

External links
 
 
 
 

1984 births
Living people
German male field hockey players
Olympic field hockey players of Germany
Field hockey players at the 2008 Summer Olympics
Olympic gold medalists for Germany
Olympic medalists in field hockey
Field hockey players at the 2012 Summer Olympics
Medalists at the 2012 Summer Olympics
Medalists at the 2008 Summer Olympics
Sportspeople from Düsseldorf
Uhlenhorster HC players
2010 Men's Hockey World Cup players
2014 Men's Hockey World Cup players